The 1929 Creighton Bluejays football team was an American football team that represented Creighton University as a member of the Missouri Valley Conference (MVC) during the 1929 college football season. In its seventh season under head coach Chet A. Wynne, the team compiled a 2–6 record (0–3 against MVC opponents) and was outscored by a total of 183 to 68. The team played its home games at Creighton Stadium in Omaha, Nebraska.

Schedule

References

Creighton
Creighton Bluejays football seasons
Creighton Bluejays football